Rhaphidophora decursiva is a species of flowering plant in the family Araceae. It is native to China, the Indian Subcontinent, and Indochina.

Gallery

References

decursiva
Flora of tropical Asia
Flora of Indo-China
Flora of Indomalesia
Plants described in 1820